Azuma Adams (born 28 December 1997) is a Ghanaian international footballer who plays as a goalkeeper. She has appeared in two match for the Ghana women's national under-17 football team. She was on the Squad at the 2012 FIFA U-17 Women's World Cup, 2014 FIFA U-17 Women's World Cup and 2016 FIFA U-20 Women's World Cup

See also
List of Ghana women's international footballers

References

Living people
1997 births
Women's association football goalkeepers
Ghanaian women's footballers
Ghana women's international footballers
Hasaacas Ladies F.C. players
People from Tamale, Ghana